Christian Hebel (born December 29, 1975) is an American violinist, songwriter, arranger and concertmaster. He has appeared on multi-Platinum, Gold, Emmy Award, Academy Awards, Tony Award, and Grammy Award winning recordings as well as film scores and Broadway theatre.

An accomplished live and recorded musician, Christian is also Artistic Director for the National YoungArts Foundation.

Career

The Last Play at Shea with Billy Joel
In 2008 Hebel joined Billy Joel on his summer tour, culminating with two shows that were the final concerts at Shea Stadium before its demolition. The concerts were on July 16, 2008, and July 18, 2008 with guest performers including Tony Bennett, Don Henley, John Mayer, John Mellencamp, Steven Tyler, Roger Daltrey, Garth Brooks, and Paul McCartney. The concerts were featured in the 2010 documentary film The Last Play at Shea. The film was released on DVD on February 8, 2011. The CD and DVD of the show, Live at Shea Stadium: The Concert were released on March 8, 2011.

Rufus Does Judy at Carnegie Hall with Rufus Wainwright
Hebel worked with Rufus Wainwright in 2006 serving as Concertmaster for his sold-out tribute concerts at Carnegie Hall to American actress and singer Judy Garland, titled Rufus Does Judy at Carnegie Hall. The live concert recording was released as a two disc set through Geffen Records in December 2007 and earned a 2009 Grammy Award nomination for Best Traditional Pop Vocal Album.

With Barbra Streisand
In 2006 Hebel joined Barbra Streisand for her concert tour Streisand: The Tour which began on October 4, 2006 at the Wachovia Center in Philadelphia and concluded at Staples Center in Los Angeles on November 20, 2006. On April 25, 2009, CBS aired Streisand's latest television special, Streisand: Live in Concert, highlighting the featured stop from the 2006 North American tour in Fort Lauderdale, Florida. A selection of concerts was then released commercially.

In the summer of 2007, Hebel joined Streisand on her Barbra Live tour where she gave concerts for the first time in continental Europe. On October 11, 2012, he participated in Streisand's concert tour in front of 18,000 fans as part of the Hebel joined Streisand for a three-hour concert performance before a crowd of 18,000 in Barclays Center in Brooklyn (Streisand's first concert in her home borough). This included tributes to Donna Summer and Marvin Hamlisch.

Hebel performed on Streisand's September 2014 release of Partners, an album of duets that features collaborations with Elvis Presley, Andrea Bocelli, Stevie Wonder, Lionel Richie, Billy Joel, Babyface, Michael Bublé, Josh Groban, John Mayer, John Legend, Blake Shelton and Jason Gould.

Hebel was also in the studio recording with Streisand in May 2016 on her album Encore: Movie Partners Sing Broadway, released in August of that year.

Hebel became Streisand's solo violinist in 2016 and joined her on her North American tour Barbra: The Music, The Mem'ries, The Magic. The tour initially visited nine locations in North America, then was extended to include four additional stops, for a total of 14 shows in 13 cities. Hebel is featured in a Netflix special that was filmed on tour.

American Music Awards- Rihanna & Ne-Yo
Hebel performed with Rihanna and Ne-Yo on the 2007 American Music Awards on November 18, 2007.  They performed Rihanna's hit songs "Umbrella" and "Hate That I Love You" which were each nominated that night.

With Josh Groban
Josh Groban chose Hebel as his solo violinist in 2011 for the Straight to You Tour to promote his recent album Illuminations. Beginning May 12, 2011 and continuing through December of that year, they undertook an 81-city tour encompassing appearances in North America, Europe and South Africa.

Hebel appeared on Groban's next studio album, All That Echoes, released on February 5, 2013. Hebel joined Groban to promote the album with the All That Echoes World Tour in 2013 performing in North America, Europe and Australia.  In 2014, Hebel joined Groban's Summer Symphony Tour where Hebel soloed with the Los Angeles Philharmonic, Colorado Symphony and Boston Pops among others.

Bruce Springsteen – Grammy Awards
On February 12, 2012, Hebel performed on stage with Bruce Springsteen and the E-Street Band to open the 54th Annual Grammy Awards live from Los Angeles, California on CBS.

George Benson
In 2015 Hebel began as Concertmaster and violin soloist with George Benson joining Benson on tour at venues and jazz festivals throughout Europe.

National YoungArts Foundation
Hebel began working with the National YoungArts Foundation in 2014 as an Artistic Director and Master Artist where he has directed performances at Baryshnikov Arts Center, New York Live Arts and will be directing an upcoming performance at The Kennedy Center.  The National YoungArts Foundation identifies and nurtures the most accomplished young artists from across the United States ages 15–18 in the visual, literary, design and performing arts and is the sole nominator for the U.S. Presidential Scholar in the Arts.

Broadway

Next to Normal
In 2005 Hebel originated and helped create the violin part in Tom Kitt and Brian Yorkey's American rock musical Next to Normal. The show had a record breaking run on Broadway around the world, won 3 Tony Awards in 2009, and the Pulitzer Prize in 2010.

Speaking of Hebel, Kitt describes "Christian provided the depth and virtuosity that I needed and helped me define what for me, would become one of the most important elements in the music".

American Idiot
In 2009 Hebel originated and helped create the violin role in Green Day's punk rock Broadway show American Idiot. The show went on to win 2 Tony Awards and won the Grammy Award in 2011 for Best Musical Show Album.

Wicked
Hebel originated and helped create the role of Concertmaster for the hit Broadway show Wicked in 2003.  Hebel held the role of Concertmaster for over 12 years on Broadway where they won 3 Tony Awards and received a Grammy Award. On July 12, 2018, with its 6,138th performance, it surpassed A Chorus Line to become Broadway's sixth-longest running show. In March 2016, Wicked surpassed $1 billion in total Broadway revenue, joining both The Phantom of the Opera and The Lion King as the only Broadway shows to do so. In July 2017, Wicked surpassed The Phantom of the Opera as Broadway's second-highest grossing show, trailing only The Lion King.

The Light in the Piazza
Hebel originated and helped create the violin and concertmaster role in Craig Lucas and Adam Guettel's 2005 Broadway musical The Light in the Piazza. Hebel began work on the show in 2002 in New York City and performed in productions in Seattle in 2003 and on Broadway in 2005. The show was awarded 6 Tony Awards in 2005.

Sondheim On Sondheim
Hebel originated and helped create the violin part for Stephen Sondheim's Broadway show Sondheim On Sondheim in 2010 starring Barbara Cook and Vanessa Williams. The musical features interviews with Sondheim. The songs, including well-known, less-known and cut material, were from nineteen Sondheim shows (including student shows) produced over a 62-year period, including several songs from each of West Side Story, Company, Follies, A Funny Thing Happened on the Way to the Forum, Sunday in the Park with George, Merrily We Roll Along, Passion, and Into the Woods. Songs from his school years are included.

Spring Awakening
Hebel was the Music Coordinator for the 2015 Broadway production of Duncan Sheik's Grammy Award and Tony Award winning rock musical Spring Awakening.

Discography
Hebel has achieved commercial success with both pop and classical albums.

Studio albums

Live albums

Film Soundtracks and Broadway

Television

 Family Guy
 American Dad!
 Wonder Pets!
 Agents of S.H.I.E.L.D.
 The Orville
 Star Trek: Discovery
 Altered Carbon
 Daredevil
 Counterpart
 Grease: Live
 The Marvelous Mrs. Maisel
 Strange Angel
 Castle Rock
 The Umbrella Academy

Personal life
Hebel married actress Rachael Harris on April 30, 2015 and they lived and worked in Los Angeles, California and New York City with their two sons Henry (born 2016) and Otto (born 2018). On August 22, 2019, it was revealed that Harris filed for divorce from Hebel.

References

External links

American classical violinists
Male classical violinists
American male violinists
1975 births
Living people
Musicians from Michigan
People from Plymouth, Michigan
21st-century classical violinists
21st-century American male musicians
21st-century American violinists